= Valluvangad =

Velluvangad
- place
- Location in Kerala, India
- Coordinates: 11°5′58.67″N 76°11′49.95″E
- Country: India
- State: Kerala
- District: Malappuram

Population (2001)
  - Total: 17,641

Languages
  - Official: Malayalam, English
- Time zone: UTC+5:30 (IST)
- PIN: 676521
- Telephone code: 0483
- Vehicle registration: KL-10
- Website: www.facebook.com/Velluvangad

Valluvangad or Velluvangad a village located in the Malappuram district, in the state of Kerala, India. It is situated in Pandikkad Panchayath.

== Demographics ==
As of 2001 India census, Valluvangad had a population of 17641 with 8554 males and 9087 females.
